The Maryland Bays were an inaugural franchise of the third incarnation of the American Soccer League in 1988.They were based in Catonsville, Maryland, and played their games at the University of Maryland-Baltimore County. The team joined the American Professional Soccer League in 1990 when the ASL merged with the Western Soccer League. After the 1990 season, the club absorbed the Washington Stars, and moved to play in Columbia, Maryland.

For the first Maryland-based team called the Bays in 1967, see Baltimore Bays of the NPSL/NASL. For the second team to use the name in the ASL, see Baltimore Bays (ASL). For the fourth team to use the name in the USISL, see Baltimore Bays (USISL).

Year-by-year

Owner
 John Liparini

Coach
 Lincoln Phillips (1988)
 Pete Caringi 1990
 Gary Hindley 1991

Honors
Championships
 American Professional Soccer Champions 1990 defeated San Francisco Blackhawks in the Finals.
 1990 Record 20–5–0 Undefeated in Playoffs, including Sweep of Tampa and Ft. Lauderdale in Playoffs.

MVP
 1990 Philip Gyau
 1991 Jean Harbor

Leading Scorer
 1991 Jean Harbor

Coach of the Year
 1991 Gary Hindley

First Team All Star
 1988 Rob Ryerson, Elvis Comrie
 1989 Eric Hawkes
 1990 Philip Gyau
 1991 Kevin Sloan, Jean Harbor

References
      

Defunct soccer clubs in Maryland
American Soccer League (1988–89) teams
American Professional Soccer League teams
1988 establishments in Maryland
1991 disestablishments in Maryland
Association football clubs disestablished in 1991
Association football clubs established in 1988
Soccer clubs in Maryland
Catonsville, Maryland
Columbia, Maryland